Peridinin is a light-harvesting apocarotenoid, a pigment associated with chlorophyll and found in the peridinin-chlorophyll-protein (PCP) light-harvesting complex in dinoflagellates, best studied in Amphidinium carterae.

Biological significance

Peridinin is an apocarotenoid pigment that some organisms use in photosynthesis. Many photosynthetic dinoflagellates use peridinin, which absorbs blue-green light in the 470-550nm range, outside the range accessible to chlorophyll molecules. The peridinin-chlorophyll-protein complex is a specialized molecular complex consisting of a boat-shaped protein molecule with a large central cavity that contains peridinin, chlorophyll, and lipid molecules, usually in a 4:1 ratio of peridinin to chlorophyll.

Spectral characteristics

 Absorption maximum: 483 nm
 Emission maximum: 676 nm
 Extinction coefficient (ε): 1.96 x 106 M−1cm−1
 A483/A280 ≥ 4.6

Applications
Peridinin chlorophyll (PerCP) is commonly used in immunoassays such as fluorescence-activated cell sorting (FACS) and flow cytometry. The fluorophore is covalently linked to proteins or antibodies for use in research applications.

References

Apocarotenoids
Epoxides
Acetate esters
Furanones